Ribosomal translocation takes place in the elongation of a protein in:

 
 
 Archaeal translation